The men's 4 kilometres team pursuit competition at the 1998 Asian Games was held from 15 to 17 December at Huamark Velodrome.

Schedule
All times are Indochina Time (UTC+07:00)

Results
Legend
DNF — Did not finish

Qualification

Quarterfinals

Heat 1

Heat 2

Heat 3

Heat 4

Semifinals

Heat 1

Heat 2

Finals

Bronze

Gold

References

External links 
Results

Track Men Team pursuit